Dominic Lovett (born November 8, 2002) is an American football wide receiver who plays for the Georgia Bulldogs. He originally played for the Missouri Tigers before transfering to Georgia.

Early life and high school
Lovett grew up in East St. Louis, Illinois and attended East St. Louis Senior High School. He was rated a four-star recruit and initially committed to play college football at Arizona State over offers from 20 other Power Five schools. Lovett flipped his commitment to Missouri later in his senior year.

College career

Missouri
Lovett caught 26 passes for 173 yards and also rushed for 40 yards and one touchdown during his freshman season at Missouri. He entered his sophomore season as a starter at wide receiver. Lovett was named first team All-Southeastern Conference (SEC) by the Associated Press at the end of the season after leading the Tigers with 56 receptions and 846 receiving yards with three touchdown receptions. He entered the NCAA transfer portal after the conclusion of the regular season.

Georgia
On December 2022, Lovett transferred to Georgia.

References

External links
Missouri Tigers bio

Living people
American football wide receivers
Missouri Tigers football players
Georgia Bulldogs football players
Players of American football from Illinois
2000 births